Ros Kungsomrach ( born 21 January 1996) is a Cambodian footballer who plays as a defender.

International career
He made his debut in a friendly match against Hong Kong national football team on 6 October 2016

References

External links
 

Living people
Cambodia international footballers
1996 births
Cambodian footballers
Association football defenders